Wang Xiaoyan is the name of:

Wang Xiaoyan (gymnast) (born 1968), Chinese gymnast
Wang Xiaoyan (speed skater) (born 1969), Chinese speed skater
Wang Xiaoyan (softball) (born 1970), Chinese softball player